Astralium rotularium, common name the rotary star shell or the knob star shell, is a species of sea snail, a marine gastropod mollusk in the family Turbinidae, the turban snails.

Description
The size of the shell varies between 25 mm and 50 mm. The white, subdepressed, imperforate shell has a conoid shape.  The spire is subacute. The six whorls are obliquely finely costulate with numerous prominent imbricating laterally compressed plicae at the sutures. The body whorl is carinated with plicate-nodose carina. The base of the shell is convex, squamosely concentrically lirate. The white columella is arcuate, not dentate. The aperture is oblique.

Distribution
This marine species is endemic to Australia and occurs off the Northern Territory, Queensland and Western Australia

References

 Wilson, B.R. & Gillett, K. 1971. Australian Shells: illustrating and describing 600 species of marine gastropods found in Australian waters. Sydney : Reed Books 168 pp
 Wilson, B. 1993. Australian Marine Shells. Prosobranch Gastropods. Kallaroo, Western Australia : Odyssey Publishing Vol. 1 408 pp.

External links
 To World Register of Marine Species

rotularium
Gastropods of Australia
Gastropods described in 1822